Jerome Fuller (June 26, 1808 – September 2, 1880) was an American lawyer and chief justice of Minnesota Territorial Supreme Court from 1851 to 1852.

Fuller was born in Litchfield, Connecticut in 1808, but details are scarce about his early years. At some point he moved to Brockport, New York. He was a member of the New York State Assembly (Monroe Co.) in 1843, and of the New York State Senate (27th D.) in 1848 and 1849. He was the founding editor of the Albany Register newspaper. On November 13, 1851 Fuller was appointed to the Minnesota Territorial Supreme Court by President Millard Fillmore following the removal of Aaron Goodrich. His appointment was denied by the United States Senate, but news of this did not reach St. Paul until after Fuller had arrived and started work. He sat on the court's July 1852 term and continued in his post until the end of that year.

Fuller subsequently returned to Brockport, New York, where he was elected County Judge. He died on September 2, 1880, and was buried with his wife Lucy in Lake View Cemetery, Brockport, N.Y.

References

External links

Jerome Fuller at Political Graveyard
Brief biography

1808 births
1880 deaths
Politicians from Litchfield, Connecticut
People from Brockport, New York
Editors of New York (state) newspapers
New York (state) state court judges
New York (state) state senators
Members of the New York State Assembly
Minnesota Territory judges
19th-century American judges
19th-century American politicians